James Abercromby or Abercrombie may refer to:

Sir James Abercrombie, 1st Baronet (c. 1680–1724), British Army officer and politician
Sir James Abercromby, 2nd Baronet (c. 1670–1734), Scottish MP for Banffshire
James Abercrombie (British Army officer, born 1706) (1706–1781), British general
James Abercrombie (British Army officer, born 1732) (1732–1775), British colonel
James Abercromby, 1st Baron Dunfermline (1776–1858), British politician
James Abercrombie (congressman) (1792–1861), US Representative from Alabama
James Abercrombie (inventor) (1891_1975), American inventor
James Abercrombie (priest) (1758–1841), American Episcopal priest

See also
Jim Abercrombie (1880–1948), Australian rugby league footballer
Abercrombie (surname)